Lady Kash and Krissy, sometimes credited as Kash n' Krissy, were a Singaporean Indian rapper-singer duo that was formed in September 2008 by Kalaivani Nagaraj, known as Lady Kash, and Saradha Vidianand Das, known as Krissy. The duo disbanded in December 2012.

History 
Kalaivani Nagaraj and Saradha Vidianand Das met each other during their mid-teens on a social networking website in 2006.

Career
In 2007, Nagaraj began her musical career as a rapper, as Lady Kash. In September 2008, Nagaraj and Das formed Lady Kash and Krissy as a rapper-singer duo.

Indian singer Benny Dayal, who had heard the duo's vocals after sound testing for a Kannada film, put the duo in contact with A. R. Rahman, who recorded with them the soundtrack "Irumbile Oru Irudhaiyam" in the 2010 film Enthiran. The duo also wrote the English lyrics for the song. Rahman later had them contribute to "Semmozhiyaana Thamizh Mozhiyaam", the theme song of the World Classical Tamil Conference 2010. Lady Kash and Krissy, along with Shreya Ghoshal, sang "Dochey", composed by Rahman for the Telugu film Puli.

Awards
In March 2011, Lady Kash and Krissy performed at the charity concert Sangarsh in Chennai. Later that year, they were nominated under several categories for the VIMA Music Awards 2011, and won second place in the Best Music Video category for their charity single "One".

The duo performed at MediaCorp's Hello 2012 event in Singapore. In December 2012, they performed at the Kuala Lumpur International Indian Music Festival in Malaysia.

In December 2012, the duo disbanded on good terms, to concentrate on their individual careers.

The duo won the VIMA 2013 award for Social Media Champion of Southeast Asia.

In 2014, Lady Kash and Krissy reunited temporarily to perform "Wanna Mash Up" for the soundtrack for the Hindi film Highway.

Discography

Singles

Soundtracks

Other 
 "Trash" (also titled "Cheththa", "Kachra", "Kuppa" and "Kuppai") by Rahul Nambiar, featuring Lady Kash and Krissy (who also wrote the English lyrics), released in March 2014.

References 

2008 establishments in Singapore
21st-century Singaporean women singers
Musical groups disestablished in 2012
Musical groups established in 2008
Living people
Indian women playback singers
Indian hip hop singers
Tamil musicians
Hip hop duos
Indian women pop singers
21st-century Indian women singers
21st-century Indian singers
Women hip hop musicians
Year of birth missing (living people)
Female musical duos
Singaporean musical groups
Indian musical groups